Sarbendra Khanal was the 26th Chief of Nepal Police. He was appointed as the Chief of Nepal Police after succeeding Prakash Aryal on 10 April 2018 by the cabinet decision of the Government of Nepal. He was former spokesperson of Nepal Police.

Early life and career 
Born on April 25, 1966 in Tanahu, IGP Mr. Khanal graduated with bachelor's degree in Management and master's degree in Public Administration from Tribhuvan University.

Policing career 
Khanal as a Deputy Inspector General of Police, accomplished daunting and challenging responsibility of management of sprawling traffic in Kathmandu valley which he did with pure conviction, proper planning and effective implementation of noble ideas of walkability, environment-friendly and public transport-dependability to promote road users’ safety and smooth vehicular movement. He also played an instrumental role in the rescue, relief and rehabilitation of victims in the aftermath of devastating Nepal Earthquake 2015 by fulfilling dual responsibility of Spokesperson of Nepal Police and Member of Central Police Operations formed in the Police Headquarters to coordinate rescue efforts and resource mobilization on the ground.

During his Police service as the Senior Superintendent of Police, Mr. Khanal led a large-scale investigative operation against the Manpower Companies for their involvement in swindling and exploiting foreign employment aspirants.  Similarly, several police operations were carried out against notorious criminals and gangsters, one of them being famously gunned down in police retaliatory action. In the quest to secure peace in the Indo-Nepal border, he further consolidated police cooperation with the counterpart and successfully arrested dozens of fugitives involved in cross-border crimes.

Mr. Khanal received national and international limelight for groundbreaking investigation against Nepal's national sports personalities for their involvement in match-fixing. The bold initiative and firm stance he had taken during the time of the investigation gained unprecedented recognition, which reverberated its consequences beyond the confines of sports integrity transcending to brutal act of crime against the state. Acknowledging the investigation of match-fixing case as a milestone, he was honoured by the Asian Football Confederation (AFC) amidst a special function organized in Malaysia in 2017.

Khanal as SSP of Nepal Police and in charge of Metropolitan Police Crime Division, has led the encounter of notorious gangster Kumar Ghainte and solved the football match fixing case. In the football match fixing case, he along with junior officer Inspector Sudip Raj Pathak, had led to the investigation of match fixing scandal in the Nepal national football team and found four players - Bikash Singh Chhetri, Anjan KC, Ritesh Thapa and then team Captain Sagar Thapa as guilty. AFC General Secretary Dato Windsor John also welcomed Sarbendra Khanal along with Sudip Raj Pathak to the AFC House at Kuala Lampur and quoted as:

He led and solved the case of death of taxi driver Raj Kumar Lama. Khanal is lauded as hero cop in the history of Nepal Police. Kishor Panthi quotes Khanal as:

Among the promotions from SSP to DIG, he was the highest-ranked officer on the basis of work point evaluation.

Inspector General of Police 
Sarbendra Khanal was appointed as the 26th Inspector General of Police (IGP) of Nepal Police on 10 April 2018 by the decision of the Council of Ministers of the Government of Nepal, assumed the helm of Nepal Police on 12 April 2018. 

IGP Mr. Khanal is also the Ex-Officio Head of National Central Bureau (NCB) Kathmandu, INTERPOL.

Throughout his Police career, IGP Mr. Khanal has demonstrated unsullied professionalism and uncontested courage in fulfilling his duty. Be it community policing or a more robust targeted investigations and operations, his performances have always been merited of raising policing benchmark and are reflected as models of best practices.

As a seasoned Police officer, he has also graduated in several specialized Police courses in Nepal and abroad, which includes Advanced Management and Development Course, VIP Security Training, VIP Protection Course (US, 2002), NCB Officers’ Course (Thailand, 2004), High Level Course on Police, Civil and Military Relations (Italy, 2014), Crime Investigation Training, Command Training, Advanced Security Operations Course (US, 2016) and Law of Armed Conflict Course.  Additionally, he also participated in an Inter-Ministerial Fact Finding visit to Sri Lanka and Malaysia to investigate cases of exploitation and trafficking of Nepali women in 2016.

Mr. Khanal's scintillating Police career is also credited with two United Nations Peacekeeping Missions—UN CIVPOL in United Nations International Police Task Force (UNIPTF) in Former Yugoslavia and UN FPU Commander in United Nations Stabilization Mission in Haiti (MINUSTAH), Haiti—and one special assignment at professional level in the Department of Peacekeeping Operations in the UN HQ. In recognition of his meritorious service to the people, he has been decorated by a number of medals, awards and accolades. Coveted Gorkha Dakchhin Bahu, Prahari Ratna and Suprabal Janasewa Shree along with Foreign Service Medal, UN Medal and Accession to the Throne Medal were conferred upon him for his genuine contribution in the realm of national and international peace and security.

Strong believer in ‘doing rather than saying’, Mr. Khanal inspires those around him by his incessant passion and work ethics dedicated to accomplishment of the job entrusted upon him. Emphasizing on lawful execution of Police service, he has always expressed his full commitment to promotion of rule of law, protection of human rights and zero tolerance in corruption.

Political career 
Khanal joined CPN (Unified Marxist–Leninist) ahead the 2022 elections and was a candidate for the House of Representatives for Kathmandu 6 from the party.

Personal life 
Mr. Khanal has been married to his wife, Pramila Khanal, and they have two daughters, Shreyashi Khanal and Yashaswi Khanal.

See also 

 Nepal Police
 Inspector General of Police (Nepal)

References

Nepalese police officers
Inspectors General of Police (Nepal)
Living people
1966 births